Vilijampolė is a neighborhood in the city of Kaunas, Lithuania, located on the right bank of the Neris River and the Nemunas River, near their confluence. Part of a larger  which consists of Vilijampolė,  and  neighorhoods, and covers 1,720 hectares with population of 23,687 people.

In the past it was a separate town by Kaunas. Popular nickname Slabotkė is still in use, derived from the Polish name of the place Słobódka Wiliampolska. The word Wiliampolska is an adjective from "Wiliampol" ("Wilia town")  derived from the Slavic name of the nearby Neris river - Wilia and "słobódka" means "little sloboda". Later this name was Lithuanised into "Vilijampolė". Historically, it was the home of the Slabodka yeshiva, or Yeshivas Knesses Yisrael, and the main site of the Kaunas Ghetto.

The Lithuanian Veterinary Academy campus is located in the neighbourhood. Two bridges across the Neris connects Vilijampolė with the main part of the city. Petras Vileišis Bridge connects the district with the Old Town and Varniai Bridge with the neighbourhood of Žaliakalnis.

References

 City of Kaunas - Elderate of Vilijampolė

External links

Website of Kaunas city

Neighbourhoods of Kaunas